Phelawagh is a town and tehsil of Dera Bugti District in the Balochistan province of Pakistan. The town of Phelawagh also functions as a Union Councils of Pakistan (a local government body).

References

Populated places in Dera Bugti District
Union councils of Balochistan, Pakistan